The Trilby Tour is an amateur golf tournament held in the United Kingdom. The original Trilby Tour was launched by Savile Row tailor William Hunt in 2007 and ran for 12 years, with thousands of amateurs from across the UK competing at a series of regional 18-hole tournaments for the chance to qualify for an International Grand Final. Each regional championship was broadcast on Sky Sports. Annual viewing figures in the region of 3.5 million in 2016 make the Trilby Tour one of the, if not the, largest amateur golf television series in Europe.

Following the global pandemic Covid-19, the Trilby Tour ran into financial trouble and folded. The new-look Trilby Tour was relaunched in 2021, with its new owners promising a revitalised format and a series of events that are “bigger and better than ever”. Under its new guise, the Trilby Tour opened for the first time to both male and female amateurs, with three events planned in the south of England, north of England and Scotland. Darwin Escapes currently operates three golf courses – Dundonald Links Golf Club, Irvine in Ayrshire, The Springs in Oxfordshire and Kilnwick Percy in East Yorkshire.

References

External links
 Official site

Amateur golf tournaments in the United Kingdom